Criminal Affairs is a 1997 American thriller film. It was shot in Ireland at Roger Corman's studios near Galway.

Cast
Louis Mandylor as Clint Barker
James Marshall as Mark
Renee Allman as Robin
Bill Murphy as Sheriff Madsen

Production
Jeremiah Cullinane had worked as first assistant director for a number of productions for Corman. They had difficulties finding someone who would direct Criminal Affairs so they offered the job to Cullinane.

Reception
The film premiered at the Galway Film Festival. The screening was controversial as some press claimed the film was semi pornographic, attracting controversy because Roger Corman's studio was financed with government money.

References

External links
Criminal Affairs at TCMDB

 
 Trailer at Videodetective

1997 films
American thriller films
1997 thriller films
Films produced by Roger Corman
1990s English-language films
1990s American films